Beethoven is a series of eight American films, created by John Hughes (credited as Edmond Dantès) and Amy Holden Jones, in which the plot revolves around a family attempting to control the antics of their pet Saint Bernard (named Beethoven). The first two films were theatrical releases and all subsequent releases have been direct to video. The original Beethoven hit theaters in April 1992. Its opening grossed $7,587,565. It was the year's 26th largest grossing film in the U.S. at $57,114,049.

Films

Beethoven (1992)

In Beethoven, the Newton family finds and adopts a Saint Bernard. The family, with the exception of the father, George (Charles Grodin), becomes attached to the dog. Meanwhile, a sadistic veterinarian, Dr. Herman Varnick (Dean Jones) involved with animal experimentation is planning to kill Beethoven for his latest experiment, and George, after discovering his fondness for the dog, springs into action to rescue his pet. Beethoven was released on April 3, 1992.

Beethoven's 2nd (1993)

In Beethoven's 2nd, Beethoven sires a litter of puppies, and the Newton family tries to save them from the greedy owner Regina (Debi Mazar), who alternately wishes to kill or sell the puppies. Beethoven's 2nd was released on December 17, 1993.

Beethoven's 3rd (2000)

In Beethoven's 3rd, the dog is sent across the country in an RV to attend a family reunion. While George and his family are in Europe, Beethoven is riding with the relatives of the Newtons led by George's brother Richard (Judge Reinhold) as the family avoids criminals that are after a DVD copy of The Shakiest Gun in the West that has a computer code hidden in it. Beethoven's 3rd was released on July 25, 2000.

Beethoven's 4th (2001)

In Beethoven's 4th, Beethoven accidentally gets his head stuck in the toilet, where he sent to doggy school convincing himself that Henry doesn't like him anymore. When he switches places with Michael, a Spanish dog who has mysterious manners, he gets taken to the pound. Beethoven escapes from the pound and meets Anthony, a self-running hamster, Oogie, a frog who had been abandoned for many months, denny, a runaway elephant from the zoo, and a lemur, ducky Jr who becomes friends as they break on an adventure in the City to return home. Beethoven's 4th was released on December 4, 2001.

Beethoven's 5th (2003)

Sara takes Beethoven to visit her oddball uncle. The last installment of the original storyline. Beethoven's 5th was released on December 2, 2003.

Beethoven's Big Break (2008)

The first installment of a new storyline. Beethoven becomes a movie star. Beethoven's Big Break was released on December 30, 2008.

Beethoven's Christmas Adventure (2011)
This story is narrated by John Cleese, who tells of the story of Beethoven's Christmas adventure. At the North Pole, Santa is giving out jobs to over 200 new elves. One of the elves, Henry (Kyle Massey), is assigned the job of stable elf, where he must take care of the reindeer. Henry objects, claiming that the job as a stable elf is unclean, but Santa did not change his mind. Henry tried making a toy one night in order to prove Santa wrong but got zapped by his own creation and inadvertently fed the magic berries to the reindeer which in turn began to fly away with the sleigh, with Henry inside it. During the flight, he loses Santa's toy bag.

In Wood Haven, Minnesota, Mason Cooper (Munro Chambers) is unsuccessfully trying to sell hot chocolate. His mother Christine (Kim Rhodes) stops by and asks her son to watch Beethoven. Beethoven was going to star in the Christmas parade and Christine was assigned by her boss Mr. Rexford (John O'Hurley) to create a Hollywood-themed float for the parade. While Mason was babysitting him, Beethoven sees Santa's sleigh with Henry in it flying over the town and he follows the sleigh. He and Mason find Henry who evicted himself from the sleigh. Henry asks Mason for help in finding Santa's toy bag. At first Mason does not believe Henry is a real Christmas elf and that Santa was not real until he witnessed Henry communicating with Beethoven using a magic candy cane that when licked can give the human the ability to communicate with any animals.

Elsewhere, grumpy Sylvester Smirch (Robert Picardo), the owner of a toy store called Most Wanted Toys and his assistant Kenny (Curtis Armstrong) have been secretly stealing toys from other stores and overpricing them. While driving on the highway, Smirch comes across Santa's Toy Bag and only realizes what it is after pulling out several toys from it to see them increase to full size. Before leaving with the toy bag, Smirch is witnessed by a stray whose foot was stuck to an old mattress.

Back at the Cooper household, Henry lies to Mason by saying he is a Christmas elf, one that makes toys. Christine returns home and evicts Henry because she did not believe he was a real Christmas elf. Mason secretly lets Henry spend the night in the garage.

The next morning Henry and Beethoven leave to find the magic toy sack. Henry had a piece of fabric that ripped off of the bag which Beethoven used its scent to try to sniff out its location. Mason leaves shortly after to find Henry and Beethoven after discovering that they were gone.

Smirch and Kenny decide to advertise with the toy bag but during the commercial, they are interrupted by Henry and Beethoven. Smirch flees with the toy bag and is picked up by Kenny shortly after and thus, Henry fails to get a visual on Smirch. During the search for the toy bag, Beethoven is whisked away on a sleigh ride with Santa for the first time, and is wrapped in a present by the elves. Although he manages to escape, he badly injures his leg and is forced to limp.

Mason comes across the stray and frees his foot from the mattress. The stray follows Mason and they meet up with Henry and Beethoven. The stray then reveals to Henry that he got a good visual of Smirch. They return to the garage in the Cooper's house, and while sketching out a drawing of Smirch from the stray's description, Henry accidentally sets a model of Beethoven's parade float on fire. Mason is blamed for it by Christine who refuses to believe her son's words that Henry did it. Beethoven is healed by Santa who finds him laying in his toy bag that he lost and they set out to rescue Mason from his room. When they arrive in minnesota, they find the parade on fire and try to stop the fire by calling the firefighters. Beethoven accidentally Chomps the hose, causing the parade to go out of control and soak everyone and the elves.

Mason fails to recognize the sketch drawing of Smirch and Henry reveals to Mason about being a Stable Elf. He explains to Mason about wanting to make toys like his fellow elves but Mason reassures him, thinking that being a stable elf is better than making toys. That night Mason, Henry, Beethoven and Christine sneak to the North Pole and take one of the presents. However Beethoven is distracted by a TV ad and decides to go on his own.

Because Mason was forbidden to leave the house, Beethoven, and Christine entered the toy store alone during business hours and Henry tries to convince the patrons that the toys were from Santa's toy bag and that Smirch had stolen them. Smirch kicks Henry out of the store. Henry then distracts Smirch and Kenny by singing with a group of Christmas carolers while Beethoven and Christine steal the bag. They return home to tell Mason their idea only to recognize that he ran away to find Santa in the North Pole, heartbreaking Beethoven.

Beethoven then persuades Christine to lick the Dog Candy Cane and insists to her that Mason was telling the truth the whole time. Believing that this was happening, Christine catches up to Mason, explaining that she loves him and that she doesn't want him to feel the same way that she doesn't love her. They then Rush the North Pole and place the present back in the pile of presents before telling Henry their idea.

Mason, Beethoven, and Christine arrive at the store and discover that Smirch had kidnaped Henry after he had revealed to him that the elves made enough toys in the bag for one year. Smirch believes that Henry is a toy-making elf and kidnaps him to receive more income. Smirch stuffs Henry in the toy bag and he and Kenny flee on motorcycles to the park where the parade's floats are being worked on. Smirch crashes onto the Beethoven float and is trapped in a large plastic Christmas ornament, leading to his arrest for toy theft.

Mason then helps his mother get the promotion that she was working to achieve by adding a partnership with the ASPCA and invites the dogs from the shelter to ride with Beethoven in the parade. Late that evening, Henry thanks Mason for showing him that being a stable elf is something very special. Mason thanks Henry for helping him realize that believing in Santa is not a child thing. Using the power of the magic berries, Beethoven flies Henry back to the North Pole with the toy bag in a sleigh. Mason decides to keep the stray and names him Henry. 

Santa makes his deliveries and gives Beethoven a ride home.

In a mid-credits scene, a boy (who appeared in a previous scene) has his skateboard stolen by other children. 

Unlike the other films in the franchise, Beethoven has a speaking voice, which was provided by Tom Arnold.

Beethoven's Treasure Tail (2014)
After getting fired from a film, Beethoven begins the long journey home with his trainer, Eddie. They become stranded in a small coastal town, where the beloved canine befriends a young boy who is searching for buried treasure. Beethoven's Treasure Tail was released on October 28, 2014.

Television

Beethoven (1994)

Cast and crew

Principal cast

Note: A dark gray cell indicates the character does not appear in the film.

Additional crew

Reception

Critical and public response

Home media
All films are available on DVD, both individually and as part of packs and collections of two or more films.

Other media

Toys
A line of toys was produced in conjunction with the first two films, and some toys are available on an ongoing basis.

Video games
In 1993, a side-scrolling video game was released called Beethoven: The Ultimate Canine Caper based on Beethoven's 2nd for Super NES, Game Boy and DOS.

In 1994, a version of Beethoven: The Ultimate Canine Caper, was developed for the Sega Genesis and Game Gear. Though completed, it was cancelled before release.

See also
 Air Bud (series)

References

Films about dogs
Films about pets
Film series introduced in 1992
Universal Pictures franchises
Comedy film franchises
Children's film series